John Redford (c. 1500 - died October or November 1547) was a major English composer, organist, and dramatist of the Tudor period.  From about 1525 he was organist at St Paul's Cathedral (succeeding Thomas Hickman). He was choirmaster there from 1531 until his death in 1547. Many of his works are represented in the Mulliner Book.

Redford is notable as one of the earliest composers, rather than improvisers, of organ music, having notated a significant quantity of keyboard music, all of it liturgical in function, based on plainchant melodies; a few vocal works by him also survive.

As he held the post of Almoner and Master of the Choristers, Redford was responsible for the arrangement of the choristers performances, including writing and directing plays and interludes. The most celebrated of these entertainments is the morality play, The Play of Wyt and Science (written ca 1530-1550), which exists in one manuscript in the British Library (MS 15233). However, the first five pages of the manuscript are missing; there is no way to know how much is lost.

Redford also wrote a number of poems, including the 23 verse Nolo mortem peccatoris, which was set to music by Thomas Morley, who was a later organist at St Paul's. Another poem is The Chorister's Lament, in which choirboys complain of the cruel beatings meted out to them:

 [wretched] 

Redford's will (dated 7 Oct., proved 29 Nov. 1547) is published in the Records of Early English Drama. It states that he lived with his sister Margaret Coxe, most likely in the Almoner's House located on the south side of St. Paul's cathedral.

References

External links
 
 A modern edition of The Play of Wit and Science
 The complete text of the poem Nolo mortem peccatoris

1547 deaths
Renaissance composers
English classical composers
English classical organists
British male organists
Cathedral organists
16th-century English musicians
16th-century English composers
Year of birth uncertain
English male classical composers
Male classical organists